Umar Baker is a Dutch cricketer. He made his List A debut for the Netherlands against the United Arab Emirates on 19 July 2017.

References

External links
 

Year of birth missing (living people)
Living people
Dutch cricketers
Place of birth missing (living people)